Allium omeiense is a plant species endemic to Sichuan, China. The people of Emei Shuan grow Allium omeiense as a garden vegetable. It also grows in the wild on slopes and along stream banks.

Allium omeiense has thick, fleshy roots, plus a bulb up to 2 cm in diameter. Scape is up to 70 cm tall, round in cross-section; Leaves is sword-shaped, longer than the scape. Umbel is hemispheric with white flowers.

References

omeiense
Onions
Vegetables
Flora of China
Flora of Sichuan
Plants described in 1989